Michurinsky is a rural locality (a settlement) in Korochansky District, Belgorod Oblast, Russia. The population was 275 as of 2010. There is 1 street.

Geography 
Michurinsky is located 24 km southeast of Korocha (the district's administrative centre) by road. Novy Put is the nearest rural locality.

References 

Rural localities in Korochansky District